The N-455 or National Highway 455 is a national highway in Pakistan which extends from Larkana to Shahdadkot in Sindh province. Its total length is 50 km and is maintained by the National Highway Authority.

See also

References

External links
 National Highway Authority

Roads in Pakistan
Roads in Sindh